Iepurești is a commune located in Giurgiu County, Muntenia, Romania. It is composed of six villages: Bănești, Chirculești, Gorneni, Iepurești, Stâlpu and Valter Mărăcineanu.

References

Communes in Giurgiu County
Localities in Muntenia